Milan Bojović (born 13 April 1987) is a Serbian professional footballer who plays as a striker for Mladost Lučani.

Career
Bojović came through the youth system of Partizan, but never played for the first team. He started his senior career with Radnički Klupci, before playing for Srem and Teleoptik. Between 2007 and 2012, Bojović made 138 appearances in the Serbian SuperLiga and scored 36 goals, while playing for Čukarički, Jagodina and Vojvodina.

In the 2013 winter transfer window, Bojović moved to Greece and signed with Panetolikos. He also played for Israeli club Bnei Sakhnin, before returning to Greece and signing with Larissa in January 2015. From June to September 2015, Bojović was unable to play in the country, due to expired visa.

In July 2016, Bojović returned to his homeland and signed with his hometown club Mladost Lučani. He was the team's top scorer with 16 league goals in the 2016–17 season, leading them to a fourth-place finish, their highest league position to date. In June 2017, Bojović signed for Kazakhstan Premier League side Kaisar, with the club announcing his departure to Zhetysu in January 2018.

In the 2019 winter transfer window, Bojović made a return to Mladost Lučani. He scored his 100th goal in the Serbian SuperLiga on 12 November 2022.

Career statistics

References

External links
 
 

1987 births
Living people
People from Lučani
Serbian footballers
Association football forwards
FK Radnički Klupci players
FK Srem players
FK Teleoptik players
FK Čukarički players
FK Jagodina players
FK Vojvodina players
Panetolikos F.C. players
Bnei Sakhnin F.C. players
Athlitiki Enosi Larissa F.C. players
FK Mladost Lučani players
FC Kaisar players
FC Zhetysu players
FK Radnički Niš players
Serbian SuperLiga players
Football League (Greece) players
Super League Greece players
Israeli Premier League players
Kazakhstan Premier League players
Serbian expatriate footballers
Expatriate footballers in Greece
Expatriate footballers in Israel
Expatriate footballers in Kazakhstan
Serbian expatriate sportspeople in Greece
Serbian expatriate sportspeople in Israel
Serbian expatriate sportspeople in Kazakhstan